Bellura obliqua, the cattail borer, is a species of cutworm or dart moth in the family Noctuidae. It was first described by Francis Walker in 1865 and it is found in North America.

The MONA or Hodges number for Bellura obliqua is 9525.

References

Further reading

 
 
 

Noctuinae
Articles created by Qbugbot
Moths described in 1865